Nowe Worowo  is a village in the administrative district of Gmina Ostrowice, within Drawsko County, West Pomeranian Voivodeship, in north-western Poland.

References

Nowe Worowo